The Almshouses are a group of grade I listed early-15th century almshouses in Church Street, Stratford-upon-Avon, Warwickshire, England. They adjoin the Guildhall which dates from the same time period. The almshouses still remain in use for their original purpose.

History
The almshouses were constructed between 1417 and 1428 by the Guild of the Holy Cross. They were originally built for old or needy members of the guild, but when the guild was abolished, they were transferred in 1553 to Stratford-upon-Avon Corporation and were enlarged in order to provide homes for 24 elderly townsfolk.

They were restored in 1892, and again during 1982–84. They became grade I listed in 1951.

Today
Since their 1980s refurbishment, the almshouses today provide 11 units, each of which have own kitchen and bathroom. To the rear, there is a communal lounge and garden, and a resident warden.

References

External links


Grade I listed buildings in Warwickshire
Buildings and structures in Stratford-upon-Avon
Almshouses in Warwickshire